Uranium dermatosis is a cutaneous condition characterized by an irritant contact dermatitis and skin burns due to exposure to uranium.

See also 
 Beryllium granuloma
 List of cutaneous conditions

References 

Skin conditions resulting from physical factors